The Mediterranean Sea is a sea connected to the Atlantic Ocean, surrounded by the Mediterranean Basin and almost completely enclosed by land: on the north by Southern Europe and Anatolia, on the south by North Africa, and on the east by the Levant. The Mediterranean has played a central role in the history of Western civilization. Geological evidence indicates that around 5.9 million years ago the Mediterranean was cut off from the Atlantic and was partly or completely desiccated over a period of some 600,000 years during the Messinian salinity crisis before being refilled by the Zanclean flood about 5.3 million years ago.

The Mediterranean Sea encompasses a vast number of islands, some of them of volcanic origin. The two largest islands, in both area and population, are Sicily and Sardinia.

The north–south length varies greatly between different shorelines and whether only straight routes are considered. The water temperatures are mild in winter and warm in summer and give name to the Mediterranean climate type due to the majority of precipitation falling in the cooler months. Its southern and eastern coastlines are lined with hot deserts not far inland, but the immediate coastline on all sides of the Mediterranean tends to have strong maritime moderation.

The sea was an important route for merchants and travellers of ancient times, facilitating trade and cultural exchange between the peoples of the region. The history of the Mediterranean region is crucial to understanding the origins and development of many modern societies. The Roman Empire maintained nautical hegemony over the sea for centuries and is the only state to have ever controlled all of its' coast.

The countries surrounding the Mediterranean in clockwise order are Spain, France, Monaco, Italy, Slovenia, Croatia, Bosnia and Herzegovina, Montenegro, Albania, Greece, Turkey, Syria, Lebanon, Israel, Palestine, Egypt, Libya, Tunisia, Algeria, and Morocco; Malta and Cyprus are island countries in the sea. In addition, Gibraltar and Ceuta, have coastlines on the sea. The drainage basin encompasses a large number of other countries, the Nile being the longest river ending in the Mediterranean Sea.

History

Ancient civilizations

Major ancient civilizations were located around the Mediterranean. The sea provided routes for trade, colonization, and war, as well as food (from fishing and the gathering of other seafood) for numerous communities throughout the ages.

The most notable Mediterranean civilizations in classical antiquity were the Greek city states, Persians and the Phoenicians, both of which extensively colonized the coastlines of the Mediterranean.

Darius I of Persia, who conquered Ancient Egypt, built a canal linking the Mediterranean to the Red Sea. Darius's canal was wide enough for two triremes to pass each other with oars extended and required four days to traverse.

Later, when Augustus founded the Roman Empire, the Romans referred to the Mediterranean as Mare Nostrum ("Our Sea"). For the next 400 years, the Roman Empire completely controlled the Mediterranean Sea and virtually all its coastal regions from Gibraltar to the Levant.

In 2019, the archaeological team of experts from the Underwater Research Center of the Akdeniz University (UA) revealed a shipwreck dating back 3,600 years in the Mediterranean Sea in Turkey. 1.5 tons of copper ingots found in the ship were used to estimate its age. The Governor of Antalya Munir Karaloğlu described this valuable discovery as the "Göbeklitepe of the underwater world”. It has been confirmed that the shipwreck, dating back to 1600 BC, is older than the "Uluburun Shipwreck" dating back to 1400 BC.

Middle Ages and empires
The Western Roman Empire collapsed around 476 AD. The east was again dominant as Roman power lived on in the Byzantine Empire formed in the 4th century from the eastern half of the Roman Empire. Another power arose in the 7th century, and with it the religion of Islam, which soon swept across from the east; at its greatest extent, the Arabs, under the Umayyads, controlled most of the Mediterranean region and left a lasting footprint on its eastern and southern shores.

The Arab invasions disrupted the trade relations between Western and Eastern Europe while disrupting trade routes with Eastern Asian Empires. This, however, had the indirect effect of promoting trade across the Caspian Sea. The export of grains from Egypt was re-routed towards the Eastern world. Products from East Asian empires, like silk and spices, were carried from Egypt to ports like Venice and Constantinople by sailors and Jewish merchants. The Viking raids further disrupted the trade in western Europe and brought it to a halt. However, the Norsemen developed the trade from Norway to the White Sea, while also trading in luxury goods from Spain and the Mediterranean. The Byzantines in the mid-8th century retook control of the area around the north-eastern part of the Mediterranean. Venetian ships from the 9th century armed themselves to counter the harassment by Arabs while concentrating trade of Asian goods in Venice.

The Fatimids maintained trade relations with the Italian city-states like Amalfi and Genoa before the Crusades, according to the Cairo Geniza documents. A document dated 996 mentions Amalfian merchants living in Cairo. Another letter states that the Genoese had traded with Alexandria. The caliph al-Mustansir had allowed Amalfian merchants to reside in Jerusalem about 1060 in place of the Latin hospice.

The Crusades led to the flourishing of trade between Europe and the outremer region. Genoa, Venice and Pisa created colonies in regions controlled by the Crusaders and came to control the trade with the Orient. These colonies also allowed them to trade with the Eastern world. Though the fall of the Crusader states and attempts at banning of trade relations with Muslim states by the Popes temporarily disrupted the trade with the Orient, it however continued.

Europe started to revive, however, as more organized and centralized states began to form in the later Middle Ages after the Renaissance of the 12th century.

Ottoman power based in Anatolia continued to grow, and in 1453 extinguished the Byzantine Empire with the Conquest of Constantinople. Ottomans gained control of much of the eastern part sea in the 16th century and also maintained naval bases in southern France (1543–1544), Algeria and Tunisia. Barbarossa, the Ottoman captain is a symbol of this domination with the victory of the Battle of Preveza (1538). The Battle of Djerba (1560) marked the apex of Ottoman naval domination in the eastern Mediterranean. As the naval prowess of the European powers increased, they confronted Ottoman expansion in the region when the Battle of Lepanto (1571) checked the power of the Ottoman Navy. This was the last naval battle to be fought primarily between galleys.

The Barbary pirates of Northwest Africa preyed on Christian shipping and coastlines in the Western Mediterranean Sea. According to Robert Davis, from the 16th to 19th centuries, pirates captured 1 million to 1.25 million Europeans as slaves.

The development of oceanic shipping began to affect the entire Mediterranean. Once, most of the trade between Western Europe and the East was passing through the region, but after the 1490s the development of a sea route to the Indian Ocean allowed the importation of Asian spices and other goods through the Atlantic ports of western Europe.

The sea remained strategically important. British mastery of Gibraltar ensured their influence in Africa and Southwest Asia. Especially after the naval battles of Abukir (1799, Battle of the Nile) and Trafalgar (1805), the British had for a long time strengthened their dominance in the Mediterranean. Wars included Naval warfare in the Mediterranean during World War I and Mediterranean theatre of World War II.

With the opening of the lockless Suez Canal in 1869, the flow of trade between Europe and Asia changed fundamentally. The fastest route now led through the Mediterranean towards East Africa and Asia. This led to a preference for the Mediterranean countries and their ports like Trieste with direct connections to Central and Eastern Europe experienced a rapid economic rise. In the 20th century, the 1st and 2nd World Wars as well as the Suez Crisis and the Cold War led to a shift of trade routes to the European northern ports, which changed again towards the southern ports through European integration, the activation of the Silk Road and free world trade.

21st century and migrations

In 2013, the Maltese president described the Mediterranean Sea as a "cemetery" due to the large number of migrants who drowned there after their boats capsized. European Parliament president Martin Schulz said in 2014 that Europe's migration policy "turned the Mediterranean into a graveyard", referring to the number of drowned refugees in the region as a direct result of the policies. An Azerbaijani official described the sea as "a burial ground ... where people die".

Following the 2013 Lampedusa migrant shipwreck, the Italian government decided to strengthen the national system for the patrolling of the Mediterranean Sea by authorising "Operation Mare Nostrum", a military and humanitarian mission in order to rescue the migrants and arrest the traffickers of immigrants. In 2015, more than one million migrants crossed the Mediterranean Sea into Europe.

Italy was particularly affected by the European migrant crisis. Since 2013, over 700,000 migrants have landed in Italy, mainly sub-Saharan Africans.

Geography

The Mediterranean Sea connects:
 to the Atlantic Ocean by the Strait of Gibraltar (known in Homer's writings as the "Pillars of Hercules") in the west
 to the Sea of Marmara and the Black Sea, by the Straits of the Dardanelles and the Bosporus respectively, in the east

The westernmost point of the Mediterranean is located at the transition from the Alborán Sea to the Strait of Gibraltar, the easternmost point is on the coast of the Gulf of Iskenderun in southeastern Turkey. The northernmost point of the Mediterranean is on the coast of the Gulf of Trieste near Monfalcone in northern Italy while the southernmost point is on the coast of the Gulf of Sidra near the Libyan town of El Agheila.

Large islands in the Mediterranean include:
 Cyprus, Crete, Euboea, Rhodes, Lesbos, Chios, Kefalonia, Corfu, Limnos, Samos, Naxos, and Andros in the Eastern Mediterranean
 Sicily, Cres, Krk, Brač, Hvar, Pag, Korčula, and Malta in the central Mediterranean
 Sardinia, Corsica, and the Balearic Islands: Ibiza, Majorca, and Menorca in the Western Mediterranean

The Alpine arc, which also has a great meteorological impact on the Mediterranean area, touches the Mediterranean in the west in the area around Nice.

The typical Mediterranean climate has hot, dry summers and mild, rainy winters. Crops of the region include olives, grapes, oranges, tangerines, carobs and cork.

Marginal seas

The Mediterranean Sea includes 15 marginal seas:

 List of seas
 Category:Marginal seas of the Mediterranean
 Category:Gulfs of the Mediterranean
 Category:Straits of the Mediterranean Sea
 Category:Channels of the Mediterranean Sea

Note 1: The International Hydrographic Organization defines the area as generic Mediterranean Sea, in the Western Basin. It does not recognize the label Sea of Sardinia.

Note 2: Thracian Sea and Myrtoan Sea are seas that are part of the Aegean Sea.

Note 3: The Black Sea is not considered part of it.

Extent

The International Hydrographic Organization defines the limits of the Mediterranean Sea as follows: Stretching from the Strait of Gibraltar in the west to the entrances to the Dardanelles and the Suez Canal in the east, the Mediterranean Sea is bounded by the coasts of Europe, Africa, and Asia and is divided into two deep basins:
 Western Basin:
 On the west: A line joining the extremities of Cape Trafalgar (Spain) and Cape Spartel (Africa)
 On the northeast: The west coast of Italy. In the Strait of Messina, a line joining the north extreme of Cape Paci (15°42′E) with Cape Peloro, the east extreme of the Island of Sicily. The north coast of Sicily
 On the east: A line joining Cape Lilibeo the western point of Sicily, through the Adventure Bank to Cape Bon (Tunisia)
 Eastern Basin:
 On the west: The northeastern and eastern limits of the Western Basin
 On the northeast: A line joining Kum Kale (26°11′E) and Cape Helles, the western entrance to the Dardanelles
 On the southeast: The entrance to the Suez Canal
 On the east: The coasts of Lebanon, Syria, and Israel

Hydrography

The drainage basin of the Mediterranean Sea is particularly heterogeneous and extends much further than the Mediterranean region. The longest river ending in the Mediterranean Sea is the Nile, which takes its sources in equatorial Africa. The basin of the Nile constitutes about two-thirds of the Mediterranean drainage basin and encompasses areas as high as the Ruwenzori Mountains. Among other important rivers in Africa, are the Moulouya and the Chelif, both on the north side of the Atlas Mountains. In Asia, are the Ceyhan and Seyhan, both on the south side of the Taurus Mountains. In Europe, the largest basins are those of the Rhône, Ebro, Po, and Maritsa. The basin of the Rhône is the largest and extends up as far north as the Jura Mountains, encompassing areas even on the north side of the Alps. The basins of the Ebro, Po, and Maritsa, are respectively south of the Pyrenees, Alps, and Balkan Mountains, which are the major ranges bordering Southern Europe.

Total annual precipitation is significantly higher on the European part of the Mediterranean basin, especially near the Alps (the 'water tower of Europe') and other high mountain ranges. As a consequence, the river discharges of the Rhône and Po are similar to that of the Nile, despite the latter having a much larger basin. Among large natural fresh bodies of water are Lake Victoria (Nile basin), Lake Geneva (Rhône), and the Italian Lakes (Po). While the Mediterranean watershed is bordered by other river basins in Europe, it is essentially bordered by endorheic basins or deserts elsewhere.

The following countries are in the Mediterranean drainage basin while not having a coastline on the Mediterranean Sea:

 In Europe, through various rivers: Andorra, Bulgaria, Kosovo, North Macedonia, San Marino, Serbia, and Switzerland.
 In Africa, through the Nile: Congo, Burundi, Eritrea, Ethiopia, Kenya, Rwanda, South Sudan, Sudan, Tanzania and Uganda.

Coastal countries

The following countries have a coastline on the Mediterranean Sea:
 Northern shore (from west to east): Spain, France, Monaco, Italy, Slovenia, Croatia, Bosnia and Herzegovina, Montenegro, Albania, Greece, Turkey.
 Eastern shore (from north to south): Turkey, Syria, Lebanon, Israel, Palestine, Egypt.
 Southern shore (from west to east): Morocco, Algeria, Tunisia, Libya, Egypt.
 Island nations: Malta, Cyprus.

Several other territories also border the Mediterranean Sea (from west to east):
 the British overseas territory of Gibraltar
 the Spanish autonomous cities of Ceuta and Melilla and nearby islands
 the Sovereign Base Areas on Cyprus
 the Palestinian Gaza Strip

Exclusive economic zone
Exclusive economic zones in Mediterranean Sea:

Coastline length
The Coastline length is about 46,000 km.

Coastal cities

Major cities (municipalities), with populations larger than 200,000 people, bordering the Mediterranean Sea include:
 Algeria: Algiers, Annaba, Oran
 Egypt: Alexandria, Damietta, Port Said
 France: Marseille, Toulon, Nice
 Greece: Athens, Thessaloniki, Patras, Heraklion
 Israel: Ashdod, Haifa, Netanya, Rishon LeZion, Tel Aviv
 Italy: Bari, Catania, Genoa, Messina, Naples, Palermo, Rome, Taranto, Trieste, Venice
 Lebanon: Beirut, Tripoli
 Libya: Benghazi, Misrata, Tripoli, Zawiya, Zliten
 Malta: Valletta
 Morocco: Tétouan, Tangier
 Palestine: Gaza City
 Spain: Alicante, Almería, Badalona, Barcelona, Cartagena, Málaga, Palma de Mallorca, Valencia.
 Syria: Latakia, Tartus
 Tunisia: Sfax, Sousse, Tunis
 Turkey: Alanya, Antalya, Çanakkale, İskenderun, İzmir, Mersin

Subdivisions

The International Hydrographic Organization (IHO) divides the Mediterranean into a number of smaller waterbodies, each with their own designation (from west to east):
 the Strait of Gibraltar
 the Alboran Sea, between Spain and Morocco
 the Balearic Sea, between mainland Spain and its Balearic Islands
 the Ligurian Sea between Corsica and Liguria (Italy)
 the Tyrrhenian Sea enclosed by Sardinia, Corsica, Italian peninsula and Sicily
 the Ionian Sea between Italy, Albania and Greece
 the Adriatic Sea between Italy, Slovenia, Croatia, Bosnia and Herzegovina, Montenegro and Albania
 the Aegean Sea between Greece and Turkey

Other seas

Some other seas whose names have been in common use from the ancient times, or in the present:
 the Sea of Sardinia, between Sardinia and Balearic Islands, as a part of the Balearic Sea
 the Sea of Sicily between Sicily and Tunisia
 the Libyan Sea between Libya and Crete
 In the Aegean Sea,
 the Thracian Sea in its north
 the Myrtoan Sea between the Cyclades and the Peloponnese
 the Sea of Crete north of Crete
 the Icarian Sea between Kos and Chios
 the Cilician Sea between Turkey and Cyprus
 the Levantine Sea at the eastern end of the Mediterranean
Many of these smaller seas feature in local myth and folklore and derive their names from such associations.

Other features

In addition to the seas, a number of gulfs and straits are recognised:
 the Saint George Bay in Beirut, Lebanon
 the Ras Ibn Hani cape in Latakia, Syria
 the Ras al-Bassit cape in northern Syria.
 the Minet el-Beida ("White Harbour") bay near ancient Ugarit, Syria
 the Strait of Gibraltar, connects the Atlantic Ocean to the Mediterranean Sea and separates Spain from Morocco
 the Bay of Algeciras, at the southern end of the Iberian Peninsula
 the Gulf of Corinth, an enclosed sea between the Ionian Sea and the Corinth Canal
 the Pagasetic Gulf, the gulf of Volos, south of the Thermaic Gulf, formed by the Mount Pelion peninsula
 the Saronic Gulf, the gulf of Athens, between the Corinth Canal and the Mirtoan Sea
 the Thermaic Gulf, the gulf of Thessaloniki, located in the northern Greek region of Macedonia
 the Kvarner Gulf, Croatia
 the Gulf of Almeria, southeast of Spain
 the Gulf of Lion, south of France
 the Gulf of Valencia, east of Spain
 the Strait of Messina, between Sicily and Calabrian peninsula
 the Gulf of Genoa, northwestern Italy
 the Gulf of Venice, northeastern Italy
 the Gulf of Trieste, northeastern Italy
 the Gulf of Taranto, southern Italy
 the Gulf of Saint Euphemia, southern Italy, with the international airport nearby
 the Gulf of Salerno, southwestern Italy
 the Gulf of Gaeta, southwestern Italy
 the Gulf of Squillace, southern Italy
 the Strait of Otranto, between Italy and Albania
 the Gulf of Haifa, northern Israel
 the Gulf of Sidra, between Tripolitania (western Libya) and Cyrenaica (eastern Libya)
 the Strait of Sicily, between Sicily and Tunisia
 the Corsica Channel, between Corsica and Italy
 the Strait of Bonifacio, between Sardinia and Corsica
 the Gulf of Antalya, between west and east shores of Antalya (Turkey)
 the Gulf of İskenderun, between İskenderun and Adana (Turkey)
 the Gulf of İzmir, in İzmir (Turkey)
 the Gulf of Fethiye, in Fethiye (Turkey)
 the Gulf of Kuşadası, in İzmir (Turkey)
 the Bay of Kotor, in south-western Montenegro and south-eastern Croatia
 the Malta Channel, between Sicily and Malta
 the Gozo Channel, between Malta Island and Gozo

Largest islands

The Mediterranean Sea encompasses about 10,000 islands and islets, of which about 250 are permanently inhabited. In the table below are listed the ten largest by size.

Climate
Much of the Mediterranean coast enjoys a hot-summer Mediterranean climate. However, most of its southeastern coast has a hot desert climate, and much of Spain's eastern (Mediterranean) coast has a cold semi-arid climate, while most of Italy's northern (Adriatic) coast has a humid subtropical climate. Although they are rare, tropical cyclones occasionally form in the Mediterranean Sea, typically in September–November.

Sea temperature

Oceanography

Being nearly landlocked affects conditions in the Mediterranean Sea: for instance, tides are very limited as a result of the narrow connection with the Atlantic Ocean. The Mediterranean is characterised and immediately recognised by its deep blue colour.

Evaporation greatly exceeds precipitation and river runoff in the Mediterranean, a fact that is central to the water circulation within the basin. Evaporation is especially high in its eastern half, causing the water level to decrease and salinity to increase eastward. The average salinity in the basin is 38 PSU at 5 m depth.

Without this Atlantic water, the sea level of the Mediterranean Sea would fall at a rate of about 1 m per year.

In oceanography, it is sometimes called the Eurafrican Mediterranean Sea, the European Mediterranean Sea or the African Mediterranean Sea to distinguish it from mediterranean seas elsewhere.

General circulation
Water circulation in the Mediterranean can be attributed to the surface waters entering from the Atlantic through the Strait of Gibraltar (and also low salinity water entering the Mediterranean from the Black Sea through the Bosphorus). The cool and relatively low-salinity Atlantic water circulates eastwards along the North African coasts. A part of the surface water does not pass the Strait of Sicily, but deviates towards Corsica before exiting the Mediterranean. The surface waters entering the eastern Mediterranean basin circulate along the Libyan and Israeli coasts. Upon reaching the Levantine Sea, the surface waters having warmed and increased its salinity from its initial Atlantic state, is now denser and sinks to form the Levantine Intermediate Waters (LIW). Most of the water found anywhere between 50 and 600 m deep in the Mediterranean originates from the LIW. LIW are formed along the coasts of Turkey and circulate westwards along the Greek and South Italian coasts. LIW are the only waters passing the Sicily Strait westwards. After the Strait of Sicily, the LIW waters circulate along the Italian, French and Spanish coasts before exiting the Mediterranean through the depths of the Strait of Gibraltar. Deep water in the Mediterranean originates from three main areas: the Adriatic Sea, from which most of the deep water in the eastern Mediterranean originates, the Aegean Sea, and the Gulf of Lion. Deep water formation in the Mediterranean is triggered by strong winter convection fueled by intense cold winds like the Bora. When new deep water is formed, the older waters mix with the overlaying intermediate waters and eventually exit the Mediterranean. The residence time of water in the Mediterranean is approximately 100 years, making the Mediterranean especially sensitive to climate change.

Other events affecting water circulation
Being a semi-enclosed basin, the Mediterranean experiences transitory events that can affect the water circulation on short time scales. In the mid-1990s, the Aegean Sea became the main area for deep water formation in the eastern Mediterranean after particularly cold winter conditions. This transitory switch in the origin of deep waters in the eastern Mediterranean was termed Eastern Mediterranean Transient (EMT) and had major consequences on water circulation of the Mediterranean.

Another example of a transient event affecting the Mediterranean circulation is the periodic inversion of the North Ionian Gyre, which is an anticyclonic ocean gyre observed in the northern part of the Ionian Sea, off the Greek coast. The transition from anticyclonic to cyclonic rotation of this gyre changes the origin of the waters fueling it; when the circulation is anticyclonic (most common), the waters of the gyre originate from the Adriatic Sea. When the circulation is cyclonic, the waters originate from the Levantine Sea. These waters have different physical and chemical characteristics, and the periodic inversion of the North Ionian Gyre (called Bimodal Oscillating System or BiOS) changes the Mediterranean circulation and biogeochemistry around the Adriatic and Levantine regions.

Climate change
Because of the short residence time of waters, the Mediterranean Sea is considered a hot-spot for climate change effects. According to climate projections, the Mediterranean Sea could become warmer. The decrease in precipitation over the region could lead to more evaporation ultimately increasing the Mediterranean Sea salinity. Because of the changes in temperature and salinity, the Mediterranean Sea may become more stratified by the end of the 21st century, with notable consequences on water circulation and biogeochemistry. The stratification and warming have already led to the eastern Mediterranean to become a net source of CO2 to the atmosphere  notably during summer. This strong summer degassing, combined with the prolonged and pronounced stratification results in the formation of aragonite crystals abiotically in the water column. The cumulative warming at the surface of the Mediterranean has a significant impact on the ecological system. Extreme warming has led to biodiversity loss and presents an existential threat to some habitats  while making conditions more hospitable to invasive tropical species.

Biogeochemistry
In spite of its great biodiversity, concentrations of chlorophyll and nutrients in the Mediterranean Sea are very low, making it one of the most oligotrophic ocean regions in the world. The Mediterranean Sea is commonly referred to as an LNLC (Low-Nutrient, Low-Chlorophyll) area. The Mediterranean Sea fits the definition of a desert in which its nutrient contents are low, making it difficult for plants and animals to develop.

There are steep gradients in nutrient concentrations, chlorophyll concentrations and primary productivity in the Mediterranean. Nutrient concentrations in the western part of the basin are about double the concentrations in the eastern basin. The Alboran Sea, close to the Strait of Gibraltar, has a daily primary productivity of about 0.25 g C (grams of carbon) m−2 day−1 whereas the eastern basin has an average daily productivity of 0.16 g C m−2 day−1. For this reason, the eastern part of the Mediterranean Sea is termed "ultraoligotrophic". The productive areas of the Mediterranean Sea are few and small. High (i.e. more than 0.5 grams of Chlorophyll a per cubic meter) productivity occurs in coastal areas, close to the river mouths which are the primary suppliers of dissolved nutrients. The Gulf of Lion has a relatively high productivity because it is an area of high vertical mixing, bringing nutrients to the surface waters that can be used by phytoplankton to produce Chlorophyll a.

Primary productivity in the Mediterranean is also marked by an intense seasonal variability. In winter, the strong winds and precipitation over the basin generate vertical mixing, bringing nutrients from the deep waters to the surface, where phytoplankton can convert it into biomass. However, in winter, light may be the limiting factor for primary productivity. Between March and April, spring offers the ideal trade-off between light intensity and nutrient concentrations in surface for a spring bloom to occur. In summer, high atmospheric temperatures lead to the warming of the surface waters. The resulting density difference virtually isolates the surface waters from the rest of the water column and nutrient exchanges are limited. As a consequence, primary productivity is very low between June and October.

Oceanographic expeditions uncovered a characteristic feature of the Mediterranean Sea biogeochemistry: most of the chlorophyll production does not occur on the surface, but in sub-surface waters between 80 and 200 meters deep. Another key characteristic of the Mediterranean is its high nitrogen-to-phosphorus ratio (N:P). Redfield demonstrated that most of the world's oceans have an average N:P ratio around 16. However, the Mediterranean Sea has an average N:P between 24 and 29, which translates a widespread phosphorus limitation.

Because of its low productivity, plankton assemblages in the Mediterranean Sea are dominated by small organisms such as picophytoplankton and bacteria.

Geology

The geologic history of the Mediterranean Sea is complex. Underlain by oceanic crust, the sea basin was once thought to be a tectonic remnant of the ancient Tethys Ocean; it is now known to be a structurally younger basin, called the Neotethys, which was first formed by the convergence of the African and Eurasian plates during the Late Triassic and Early Jurassic. Because it is a near-landlocked body of water in a normally dry climate, the Mediterranean is subject to intensive evaporation and the precipitation of evaporites. The Messinian salinity crisis started about six million years ago (mya) when the Mediterranean became landlocked, and then essentially dried up. There are salt deposits accumulated on the bottom of the basin of more than a million cubic kilometres—in some places more than three kilometres thick.

Scientists estimate that the sea was last filled about 5.3 million years ago (mya) in less than two years by the Zanclean flood. Water poured in from the Atlantic Ocean through a newly breached gateway now called the Strait of Gibraltar at an estimated rate of about three orders of magnitude (one thousand times) larger than the current flow of the Amazon River.

A shallow submarine ridge (the Strait of Sicily) between the island of Sicily and the coast of Tunisia divides the sea in two main subregions: the Western Mediterranean, with an area of about 850,000 km2 (330,000 mi2); and the Eastern Mediterranean, of about 1.65 million km2 (640,000 mi2). Coastal areas have submarine karst springs or s, which discharge pressurised groundwater into the water from below the surface; the discharge water is usually fresh, and sometimes may be thermal.

Tectonics and paleoenvironmental analysis

The Mediterranean basin and sea system were established by the ancient African-Arabian continent colliding with the Eurasian continent. As Africa-Arabia drifted northward, it closed over the ancient Tethys Ocean which had earlier separated the two supercontinents Laurasia and Gondwana.
At about that time in the middle Jurassic period (roughly 170 million years ago ) a much smaller sea basin, dubbed the Neotethys, was formed shortly before the Tethys Ocean closed at its western (Arabian) end. The broad line of collisions pushed up a very long system of mountains from the Pyrenees in Spain to the Zagros Mountains in Iran in an episode of mountain-building tectonics known as the Alpine orogeny. The Neotethys grew larger during the episodes of collisions (and associated foldings and subductions) that occurred during the Oligocene and Miocene epochs (34 to 5.33 mya); see animation: Africa-Arabia colliding with Eurasia. Accordingly, the Mediterranean basin consists of several stretched tectonic plates in subduction which are the foundation of the eastern part of the Mediterranean Sea. Various zones of subduction contain the highest oceanic ridges, east of the Ionian Sea and south of the Aegean. The Central Indian Ridge runs east of the Mediterranean Sea south-east across the in-between of Africa and the Arabian Peninsula into the Indian Ocean.

Messinian salinity crisis

During Mesozoic and Cenozoic times, as the northwest corner of Africa converged on Iberia, it lifted the Betic-Rif mountain belts across southern Iberia and northwest Africa. There the development of the intramontane Betic and Rif basins created two roughly parallel marine gateways between the Atlantic Ocean and the Mediterranean Sea. Dubbed the Betic and Rifian corridors, they gradually closed during the middle and late Miocene: perhaps several times. In the late Miocene the closure of the Betic Corridor triggered the so-called "Messinian salinity crisis" (MSC), characterized by the deposition of a thick evaporitic sequence - with salt deposits up to 2 km thick in the Levantine sea - and by a massive drop in water level in much of the Basin. This event was for long the subject of acute scientific controversy, now much appeased, regarding its sequence, geographic range, processes leading to evaporite facies and salt deposits. The start of the MSC was recently estimated astronomically at 5.96 mya, and it persisted for some 630,000 years until about 5.3 mya; see Animation: Messinian salinity crisis, at right.

After the initial drawdown and re-flooding, there followed more episodes—the total number is debated—of sea drawdowns and re-floodings for the duration of the MSC. It ended when the Atlantic Ocean last re-flooded the basin—creating the Strait of Gibraltar and causing the Zanclean flood—at the end of the Miocene (5.33 mya). Some research has suggested that a desiccation-flooding-desiccation cycle may have repeated several times, which could explain several events of large amounts of salt deposition. Recent studies, however, show that repeated desiccation and re-flooding is unlikely from a geodynamic point of view.

Desiccation and exchanges of flora and fauna
The present-day Atlantic gateway, the Strait of Gibraltar, originated in the early Pliocene via the Zanclean Flood. As mentioned, there were two earlier gateways: the Betic Corridor across southern Spain and the Rifian Corridor across northern Morocco. The Betic closed about 6 mya, causing the Messinian salinity crisis (MSC); the Rifian or possibly both gateways closed during the earlier Tortonian times, causing a "Tortonian salinity crisis" (from 11.6 to 7.2 mya), long before the MSC and lasting much longer. Both "crises" resulted in broad connections between the mainlands of Africa and Europe, which allowed migrations of flora and fauna—especially large mammals including primates—between the two continents. The Vallesian crisis indicates a typical extinction and replacement of mammal species in Europe during Tortonian times following climatic upheaval and overland migrations of new species: see Animation: Messinian salinity crisis (and mammal migrations), at right.

The almost complete enclosure of the Mediterranean basin has enabled the oceanic gateways to dominate seawater circulation and the environmental evolution of the sea and basin. Circulation patterns are also affected by several other factors—including climate, bathymetry, and water chemistry and temperature—which are interactive and can induce precipitation of evaporites. Deposits of evaporites accumulated earlier in the nearby Carpathian foredeep during the Middle Miocene, and the adjacent Red Sea Basin (during the Late Miocene), and in the whole Mediterranean basin (during the MSC and the Messinian age). Many diatomites are found underneath the evaporite deposits, suggesting a connection between their formations.

Today, evaporation of surface seawater (output) is more than the supply (input) of fresh water by precipitation and coastal drainage systems, causing the salinity of the Mediterranean to be much higher than that of the Atlantic—so much so that the saltier Mediterranean waters sink below the waters incoming from the Atlantic, causing a two-layer flow across the Strait of Gibraltar: that is, an outflow submarine current of warm saline Mediterranean water, counterbalanced by an inflow surface current of less saline cold oceanic water from the Atlantic. In the 1920s, Herman Sörgel proposed the building of a hydroelectric dam (the Atlantropa project) across the Straits, using the inflow current to provide a large amount of hydroelectric energy. The underlying energy grid was also intended to support a political union between Europe and, at least, the Maghreb part of Africa (compare Eurafrika for the later impact and Desertec for a later project with some parallels in the planned grid).

Shift to a "Mediterranean climate"
The end of the Miocene also marked a change in the climate of the Mediterranean basin. Fossil evidence from that period reveals that the larger basin had a humid subtropical climate with rainfall in the summer supporting laurel forests. The shift to a "Mediterranean climate" occurred largely within the last three million years (the late Pliocene epoch) as summer rainfall decreased. The subtropical laurel forests retreated; and even as they persisted on the islands of Macaronesia off the Atlantic coast of Iberia and North Africa, the present Mediterranean vegetation evolved, dominated by coniferous trees and sclerophyllous trees and shrubs with small, hard, waxy leaves that prevent moisture loss in the dry summers. Much of these forests and shrublands have been altered beyond recognition by thousands of years of human habitation. There are now very few relatively intact natural areas in what was once a heavily wooded region.

Paleoclimate
Because of its latitude and its landlocked position, the Mediterranean is especially sensitive to astronomically induced climatic variations, which are well documented in its sedimentary record. Since the Mediterranean is subject to the deposition of eolian dust from the Sahara during dry periods, whereas riverine detrital input prevails during wet ones, the Mediterranean marine sapropel-bearing sequences provide high-resolution climatic information. These data have been employed in reconstructing astronomically calibrated time scales for the last 9 Ma of the Earth's history, helping to constrain the time of past geomagnetic reversals. Furthermore, the exceptional accuracy of these paleoclimatic records has improved our knowledge of the Earth's orbital variations in the past.

Biodiversity

Unlike the vast multidirectional ocean currents in open oceans within their respective oceanic zones; biodiversity in the Mediterranean Sea is that of a stable one due to the subtle but strong locked nature of currents which affects favourably, even the smallest macroscopic type of volcanic life form. The stable marine ecosystem of the Mediterranean Sea and sea temperature provides a nourishing environment for life in the deep sea to flourish while assuring a balanced aquatic ecosystem excluded from any external deep oceanic factors. It is estimated that there are more than 17,000 marine species in the Mediterranean Sea with generally higher marine biodiversity in coastal areas, continental shelves, and decreases with depth.

As a result of the drying of the sea during the Messinian salinity crisis, the marine biota of the Mediterranean are derived primarily from the Atlantic Ocean. The North Atlantic is considerably colder and more nutrient-rich than the Mediterranean, and the marine life of the Mediterranean has had to adapt to its differing conditions in the five million years since the basin was reflooded.

The Alboran Sea is a transition zone between the two seas, containing a mix of Mediterranean and Atlantic species. The Alboran Sea has the largest population of bottlenose dolphins in the Western Mediterranean, is home to the last population of harbour porpoises in the Mediterranean and is the most important feeding grounds for loggerhead sea turtles in Europe. The Alboran Sea also hosts important commercial fisheries, including sardines and swordfish. The Mediterranean monk seals live in the Aegean Sea in Greece. In 2003, the World Wildlife Fund raised concerns about the widespread drift net fishing endangering populations of dolphins, turtles, and other marine animals such as the spiny squat lobster.

There was a resident population of orcas in the Mediterranean until the 1980s, when they went extinct, probably due to long-term PCB exposure. There are still annual sightings of orca vagrants.

Environmental issues
For 4,000 years, human activity has transformed most parts of Mediterranean Europe, and the "humanisation of the landscape" overlapped with the appearance of the present Mediterranean climate. The image of a simplistic, environmental determinist notion of a Mediterranean paradise on Earth in antiquity, which was destroyed by later civilisations, dates back to at least the 18th century and was for centuries fashionable in archaeological and historical circles. Based on a broad variety of methods, e.g. historical documents, analysis of trade relations, floodplain sediments, pollen, tree-ring and further archaeometric analyses and population studies, Alfred Thomas Grove's and Oliver Rackham's work on "The Nature of Mediterranean Europe" challenges this common wisdom of a Mediterranean Europe as a "Lost Eden", a formerly fertile and forested region, that had been progressively degraded and desertified by human mismanagement. The belief stems more from the failure of the recent landscape to measure up to the imaginary past of the classics as idealised by artists, poets and scientists of the early modern Enlightenment.

The historical evolution of climate, vegetation and landscape in southern Europe from prehistoric times to the present is much more complex and underwent various changes. For example, some of the deforestation had already taken place before the Roman age. While in the Roman age large enterprises such as the latifundia took effective care of forests and agriculture, the largest depopulation effects came with the end of the empire. Some assume that the major deforestation took place in modern times—the later usage patterns were also quite different e.g. in southern and northern Italy. Also, the climate has usually been unstable and there is evidence of various ancient and modern "Little Ice Ages", and plant cover accommodated to various extremes and became resilient to various patterns of human activity.

Human activity was therefore not the cause of climate change but followed it. The wide ecological diversity typical of Mediterranean Europe is predominantly based on human behaviour, as it is and has been closely related to human usage patterns. The diversity range was enhanced by the widespread exchange and interaction of the longstanding and highly diverse local agriculture, intense transport and trade relations, and the interaction with settlements, pasture and other land use. The greatest human-induced changes, however, came after World War II, in line with the "1950s syndrome" as rural populations throughout the region abandoned traditional subsistence economies. Grove and Rackham suggest that the locals left the traditional agricultural patterns and instead became scenery-setting agents for tourism. This resulted in more uniform, large-scale formations. Among further current important threats to Mediterranean landscapes are overdevelopment of coastal areas, abandonment of mountains and, as mentioned, the loss of variety via the reduction of traditional agricultural occupations.

Natural hazards

The region has a variety of geological hazards which have closely interacted with human activity and land use patterns. Among others, in the eastern Mediterranean, the Thera eruption, dated to the 17th or 16th century BC, caused a large tsunami that some experts hypothesise devastated the Minoan civilisation on the nearby island of Crete, further leading some to believe that this may have been the catastrophe that inspired the Atlantis legend. Mount Vesuvius is the only active volcano on the European mainland, while others, Mount Etna and Stromboli, are on neighbouring islands. The region around Vesuvius including the Phlegraean Fields Caldera west of Naples are quite active and constitute the most densely populated volcanic region in the world where an eruptive event may occur within decades.

Vesuvius itself is regarded as quite dangerous due to a tendency towards explosive (Plinian) eruptions. It is best known for its eruption in AD 79 that led to the burying and destruction of the Roman cities of Pompeii and Herculaneum.

The large experience of member states and regional authorities has led to exchange on the international level with the cooperation of NGOs, states, regional and municipality authorities and private persons. The Greek–Turkish earthquake diplomacy is a quite positive example of natural hazards leading to improved relations between traditional rivals in the region after earthquakes in İzmir and Athens in 1999. The European Union Solidarity Fund (EUSF) was set up to respond to major natural disasters and express European solidarity to disaster-stricken regions within all of Europe. The largest amount of funding requests in the EU relates to forest fires, followed by floods and earthquakes. Forest fires, whether man-made or natural, are a frequent and dangerous hazard in the Mediterranean region. Tsunamis are also an often-underestimated hazard in the region. For example, the 1908 Messina earthquake and tsunami took more than 123,000 lives in Sicily and Calabria and were among the deadliest natural disasters in modern Europe.

Invasive species

The opening of the Suez Canal in 1869 created the first salt-water passage between the Mediterranean and the Red Sea. The Red Sea is higher than the Eastern Mediterranean, so the canal functions as a tidal strait that pours Red Sea water into the Mediterranean. The Bitter Lakes, which are hyper-saline natural lakes that form part of the canal, blocked the migration of Red Sea species into the Mediterranean for many decades, but as the salinity of the lakes gradually equalised with that of the Red Sea, the barrier to migration was removed, and plants and animals from the Red Sea have begun to colonise the Eastern Mediterranean. The Red Sea is generally saltier and more nutrient-poor than the Atlantic, so the Red Sea species have advantages over Atlantic species in the salty and nutrient-poor Eastern Mediterranean. Accordingly, Red Sea species invade the Mediterranean biota, and not vice versa; this phenomenon is known as the Lessepsian migration (after Ferdinand de Lesseps, the French engineer) or Erythrean ("red") invasion. The construction of the Aswan High Dam across the Nile River in the 1960s reduced the inflow of freshwater and nutrient-rich silt from the Nile into the Eastern Mediterranean, making conditions there even more like the Red Sea and worsening the impact of the invasive species.

Invasive species have become a major component of the Mediterranean ecosystem and have serious impacts on the Mediterranean ecology, endangering a number of local and endemic Mediterranean species. A first look at some groups of marine species shows that over 70% of exotic decapods  and some 2/3 of exotic fishes  found in the Mediterranean are of Indo-Pacific origin, introduced from the Red Sea via the Suez Canal. This makes the Canal the first pathway of arrival of alien species into the Mediterranean. The impacts of some Lessepsian species have proven to be considerable, mainly in the Levantine basin of the Mediterranean, where they are replacing native species and becoming a familiar sight.

According to definitions by the Mediterranean Science Commission and the International Union for Conservation of Nature, and to Convention on Biological Diversity (CBD) and Ramsar Convention terminologies, they are alien species, as they are non-native (non-indigenous) to the Mediterranean Sea, and are found outside their normal, non-adjacent area of distribution. When these species succeed in establishing populations in the Mediterranean Sea, compete with and begin to replace native species they are "Alien Invasive Species", as they are an agent of change and a threat to the native biodiversity. In the context of CBD, "introduction" refers to the movement by human agency, indirect or direct, of an alien species outside of its natural range (past or present). The Suez Canal, being an artificial (man-made) canal, is a human agency. Lessepsian migrants are therefore "introduced" species (indirect, and unintentional). Whatever wording is chosen, they represent a threat to the native Mediterranean biodiversity, because they are non-indigenous to this sea. In recent years, the Egyptian government's announcement of its intentions to deepen and widen the Canal  raised concerns from marine biologists, fearing that such an act will only worsen the invasion of Red Sea species into the Mediterranean, and lead to even more species passing through the Canal.

Arrival of new tropical Atlantic species
In recent decades, the arrival of exotic species from the tropical Atlantic has become noticeable. In many cases this reflects an expansion - favoured by a warming trend of sub-tropical Atlantic waters, and also by a fast-growing maritime traffic - of the natural range of species that now enter the Mediterranean through the Strait of Gibraltar. While not as intense as Lessepsian migration, the process is of importance and is therefore receiving increased levels of scientific coverage.

Sea-level rise
This could have adverse effects on populations across the Mediterranean:
 Rising sea levels will submerge parts of Malta. Rising sea levels will also mean rising salt water levels in Malta's groundwater supply and reduce the availability of drinking water.
 A  rise in sea level would flood  of the Nile Delta, displacing over 500,000 Egyptians.
 Cyprus wetlands are also in danger of being destroyed by the rising temperatures and sea levels.

Coastal ecosystems also appear to be threatened by sea level rise, especially enclosed seas such as the Baltic, the Mediterranean and the Black Sea. These seas have only small and primarily east–west movement corridors, which may restrict northward displacement of organisms in these areas.

Pollution
Pollution in this region has been extremely high in recent years. The Barcelona Convention aims to 'reduce pollution in the Mediterranean Sea and protect and improve the marine environment in the area, thereby contributing to its sustainable development.'
Many marine species have been almost wiped out because of the sea's pollution. One of them is the Mediterranean monk seal which is considered to be among the world's most endangered marine mammals. 
The Mediterranean is also plagued by marine debris. A 1994 study of the seabed using trawl nets around the coasts of Spain, France and Italy reported a particularly high mean concentration of debris; an average of 1,935 items per km2.

Plastic pollution
Plastic debris accounted for 76% of debris in a 1994 study, of which 94% was plastic bags.

Bottom trawling

Shipping

Some of the world's busiest shipping routes are in the Mediterranean Sea. In particular, the Maritime Silk Road from Asia and Africa leads through the Suez Canal directly into the Mediterranean Sea to its deep-water ports in Piraeus, Trieste, Genoa, Marseilles and Barcelona. It is estimated that approximately 220,000 merchant vessels of more than 100 tonnes cross the Mediterranean Sea each year—about one-third of the world's total merchant shipping. These ships often carry hazardous cargo, which if lost would result in severe damage to the marine environment.

The discharge of chemical tank washings and oily wastes also represent a significant source of marine pollution. The Mediterranean Sea constitutes 0.7% of the global water surface and yet receives 17% of global marine oil pollution.

Approximately  of oil are transported annually in the Mediterranean Sea (more than 20% of the world total), with around 250–300 oil tankers crossing the sea every day. An important destination is the Port of Trieste, the starting point of the Transalpine Pipeline, which covers 40% of Germany's oil demand (100% of the federal states of Bavaria and Baden-Württemberg), 90% of Austria and 50% of the Czech Republic. Accidental oil spills happen frequently with an average of 10 spills per year. A major oil spill could occur at any time in any part of the Mediterranean.

Tourism

The coast of the Mediterranean has been used for tourism since ancient times, as the Roman villa buildings on the Amalfi Coast or in Barcola show. From the end of the 19th century, in particular, the beaches became places of longing for many Europeans and travellers. From then on, and especially after World War II, mass tourism to the Mediterranean began with all its advantages and disadvantages. While initially, the journey was by train and later by bus or car, today the plane is increasingly used.

Tourism is today one of the most important sources of income for many Mediterranean countries, despite the man-made geopolitical conflicts in the region. The countries have tried to extinguish rising man-made chaotic zones that might affect the region's economies and societies in neighbouring coastal countries, and shipping routes. Naval and rescue components in the Mediterranean Sea are considered to be among the best due to the rapid cooperation between various naval fleets. Unlike the vast open oceans, the sea's closed position facilitates effective naval and rescue missions, considered the safest and regardless of any man-made or natural disaster.

Tourism is a source of income for small coastal communities, including islands, independent of urban centres. However, tourism has also played a major role in the degradation of the coastal and marine environment. Rapid development has been encouraged by Mediterranean governments to support the large numbers of tourists visiting the region, but this has caused serious disturbance to marine habitats by erosion and pollution in many places along the Mediterranean coasts.

Tourism often concentrates in areas of high natural wealth, causing a serious threat to the habitats of endangered species such as sea turtles and monk seals. Reductions in natural wealth may reduce the incentive for tourists to visit.

Overfishing

Fish stock levels in the Mediterranean Sea are alarmingly low. The European Environment Agency says that more than 65% of all fish stocks in the region are outside safe biological limits and the United Nations Food and Agriculture Organisation, that some of the most important fisheries—such as albacore and bluefin tuna, hake, marlin, swordfish, red mullet and sea bream—are threatened.

There are clear indications that catch size and quality have declined, often dramatically, and in many areas, larger and longer-lived species have disappeared entirely from commercial catches.

Large open-water fish like tuna have been a shared fisheries resource for thousands of years but the stocks are now dangerously low. In 1999, Greenpeace published a report revealing that the amount of bluefin tuna in the Mediterranean had decreased by over 80% in the previous 20 years and government scientists warn that without immediate action the stock will collapse.

Marine heatwaves

A study showed that climate change-related exceptional marine heatwaves in the Mediterranean Sea during 2015–2019 resulted in widespread mass sealife die-offs in five consecutive years.

Gallery

See also

 
 
 , the site of the Mediterranean cultures
 
 
 
 
 
 
 
 
 
 
 
 
 
 
 
 
 Names of the Mediterranean Sea
  – Early cartographer of the Mediterranean
 
  – also known as the Japanese Mediterranean Sea

Notes

References

External links
 
 Mediterranean Sea Microorganisms: 180+ images of Foraminifera
 Eastern Mediterranean Sea Long Term Ecological Research Station

European seas
Geography of Central Europe
Geography of North Africa
Geography of Southern Europe
Geography of Western Asia
Geography of Western Europe
Marginal seas of the Atlantic Ocean
Marine ecoregions

 
Natural history of Europe
Articles containing video clips
Seas of Albania
Seas of Africa
Seas of Asia
Seas of France
Seas of Greece
Seas of Italy
Seas of Spain
Seas of Turkey